This article is a discography of American rock musician Todd Rundgren.

Albums

Studio albums

Live albums

Compilation albums
 Anthology (1968–1985) (WEA, 1989)
 In Todd We Trust (SGC, 1989) (Nazz, Runt and Utopia)
 The Best of Todd Rundgren (Rhino, 1992)
 The Very Best of Todd Rundgren (Rhino, 1997)
 Free Soul (Victor, 14 July 1998) (Japanese release)
 The Best of Todd Rundgren "Go Ahead. Ignore Me." (Essential, 1999)
 The Essentials (Rhino, 2000)
 Best Of – I Saw the Light (Essential, 2000)
 Somewhere/Anywhere? (Rhino/Bearsville, July 17, 2000) 2 CDs (Previously unreleased demos/radio sessions and out-takes)
 Reconstructed (Anagram, April 9, 2001) (Remixes)
 The Definitive Rock Collection (Rhino, 2006)
 The Complete Bearsville Albums Collection (Bearsville, 2016) (13-CD Box Set)

Extended plays
 Todd Rundgren's Short Johnson (Hi Fi, 23 March 2010)

Singles
Below is a list of Todd Rundgren's singles that charted in the US, Australia, Canada or UK. For the sake of convenience, singles recorded by Rundgren as a member of Nazz, Runt and Utopia are listed here.

For a full discography of Nazz, see Nazz.
For a full discography of Utopia, see Utopia.

Notes

A As a member of Nazz
B As a member of Runt
C As a member of Utopia

Music videos
 "All the Children Sing" (1978)
 "Can We Still Be Friends" (1978)
 "Time Heals" (1981)
 "Hideaway" (1983)
 "Bang the Drum All Day" (1983)
 "Something to Fall Back On" (1985)
 "The Want of a Nail" (1989)
 "Change Myself" (1991)
 "Property" (1993)

Video
 The Desktop Collection and 2nd Wind Live Recording Sessions
 Live in Japan

Production
Great Speckled Bird (1969) - Great Speckled Bird
The American Dream (1970) - The American Dream
Stage Fright (1970) – The Band
Straight Up (1971) – Badfinger
Halfnelson (1971) - Sparks
New York Dolls (1973) – New York Dolls
We're an American Band (1973) – Grand Funk Railroad
Mother's Pride (1973) – Fanny
Shinin' On (1974) - Grand Funk Railroad
War Babies (1974) – Hall & Oates
Felix Cavaliere (1974) – Felix Cavaliere
Bricks (1975) – Hello People
L (1976) – Steve Hillage
Bat Out of Hell (1977) – Meat Loaf
Remote Control (1979) - The Tubes
TRB Two (1979) - Tom Robinson Band
Guitars and Women (1979) - Rick Derringer
Wave (1979) - Patti Smith Group
Wasp (1980) - Shaun Cassidy
Walking Wild (1981) - New England
Bad for Good (1981) - Jim Steinman
Forever Now (1982) – The Psychedelic Furs
Party of Two (1983) - Rubinoos
Next Position Please (1983) - Cheap Trick
Watch Dog (1983) - Jules Shear
Zerra 1 (1984) - Zerra 1
Love Bomb (1985) - The Tubes
What Is This? (1985) - What Is This?
Skylarking (1986) – XTC
Dreams of Ordinary Men (1986) - Dragon
Yoyo (1987) – Bourgeois Tagg
Love Junk (1988) – The Pursuit of Happiness
Karakuri House (1989) - Lä-Ppisch
Things Here Are Different (1990) – Jill Sobule
Cue (1990) - Hiroshi Takano
One Sided Story (1990) - The Pursuit of Happiness
Awakening (1992) - Hiroshi Takano
The World's Most Dangerous Party (1993) – Paul Shaffer
Halfway Down the Sky (1999) – Splender
The New America (2000) - Bad Religion
Separation Anxieties (2000) - 12 Rods
Cause I Sez So (2009) – New York Dolls

Related
An Elpee's Worth of Productions—tracks from albums Rundgren has produced
Reconstructed—techno remixes of Rundgren and Utopia tracks by other artists
Todd Rundgren and His Friends—various artists remake and remix Rundgren songs

See also

References

Notes

Citations 

Rock music discographies
Discographies of American artists
Production discographies
Pop music discographies
Discography